Kamar Ab or Kamarab may refer to:
 Kamarab, Kermanshah
 Kamar Ab, Khuzestan
 Kamar Ab, Markazi